This is a list of assets owned by Corus Entertainment.

Approximately 80% of the voting control in Corus is held by the family of JR Shaw. The same family also owns about 80% of the voting rights in Shaw Communications, for a list of Shaw assets, see list of assets owned by Shaw Communications.

The company's portfolio of multimedia encompasses 33 specialty television services, 39 radio stations, 15 conventional television stations, a global content business, digital assets, live events, children's book publishing, animation software, technology and media services.

Television

Conventional television 
 Global Television Network
 Global News
CIII - Toronto, Ontario (First aired 1974 with intentions of starting national network, came under partial Canwest ownership in 1977)
 CKND - Winnipeg, Manitoba (Canwest owned in 1985)
 CFRE - Regina, Saskatchewan (Canwest owned in 1987)
 CFSK - Saskatoon, Saskatchewan (Canwest owned in 1987)
 CIHF - Halifax, Nova Scotia (Canwest owned in 1994)
 CHNB - Saint John, New Brunswick (Canwest owned in 1994)
 CKMI - Montreal, Quebec (Canwest owned and Global Network launched in 1997)
 CICT - Calgary, Alberta (owned & operated since 2000)
 CISA - Lethbridge, Alberta (O&O since 2000)
 CITV - Edmonton, Alberta (O&O since 2000)
 CHAN - Vancouver, British Columbia (O&O since 2001)
 CHBC - Kelowna, British Columbia (O&O since 2009)
 CKWS - Kingston, Ontario (O&O since 2018)
 CHEX - Peterborough, Ontario (O&O since 2018)
 CHEX-2 - Oshawa, Ontario (O&O since 2018)

Specialty channels 
News
 Global News: BC 1
Lifestyle
 Cooking Channel (80.2%) (licensed by Warner Bros. Discovery)
 DTour
 Food Network (80.15%) (licensed by Warner Bros. Discovery)
 HGTV (80.24%) (licensed by Warner Bros. Discovery)
 Magnolia Network (80.24%) (licensed by Warner Bros. Discovery)
 Oprah Winfrey Network (licensed by Warner Bros. Discovery)
 Slice
Entertainment
 ABC Spark (licensed by Disney)
 Adult Swim (licensed by Warner Bros. Discovery)
 CMT (90%) (licensed by Paramount Media Networks)
 Crime & Investigation (licensed by A&E Networks)
 DejaView
 History (licensed by A&E Networks)
 History2 (licensed by A&E Networks)
 Lifetime (licensed by A&E Networks)
 MovieTime
 National Geographic (64%) (licensed by Disney)
 National Geographic Wild (64%) (licensed by Disney)
 Showcase
 W Network
Kids and family
 Cartoon Network (licensed by Warner Bros. Discovery)
 Disney Channel (licensed by Disney)
 Disney Junior (licensed by Disney)
 Disney XD (licensed by Disney)
 Nickelodeon (licensed by Nickelodeon)
 Teletoon
 Treehouse
 YTV
French-language channels
 La Chaîne Disney
 Historia
 SériesPlus
 Télétoon
Télétoon la nuit

Corus Radio

Other assets 
 B5media (minority stake) — online publisher
 Corus Airtime Sales
Marketing and advertising

Corus Tempo — a full-service marketing and creative team within the Corus National Sales group.
Cynch — a self-serve platform for buying TV campaigns online.
Kin Community Canada — an influencer marketing platform.
so.da — a full-service digital media agency.

Original content

Corus Studios — Corus Entertainment's "premium content studio."
Kids Can Press — the largest Canadian-owned children’s book publishing company.
Nelvana — a production and distribution company of children's animation programs.
 Redknot — a joint venture with Warner Bros. Discovery 
 Toon Boom Animation — an animation software company.
 Aircraft Pictures Ltd. (majority stake) — film and television entertainment.

Streaming

Curiouscast — podcast network
Global TV App — a TV Everywhere for Global TV Network subscribers.
Teletoon+ — streaming service for Cartoon Network content (formerly Nick+, a streaming service for Nickelodeon content)
 STACKTV — a subscription video streaming package offered by Corus through Amazon Prime Video Channels

Former assets

Corus Radio 
 CIZZ - Red Deer, Alberta — acquired by Newcap Radio
 CKGY - Red Deer, Alberta — acquired by Newcap Radio
 CKDO - Oshawa, Ontario — acquired by Durham Radio Inc
 CKGE - Oshawa, Ontario — acquired by Durham Radio Inc
 Corus Québec — acquired by Cogeco
 CFVM - Amqui, Quebec — acquired by Bell Media
 CJDM - Drummondville, Quebec — acquired by Bell Media
 CJRC - Gatineau, Quebec
 CFEL - Lévis, Quebec — acquired by Leclerc Communication
 CFQR - Montreal, Quebec
 CKOI - Montreal, Quebec
 CINF - Montreal, Quebec
 CINW - Montreal, Quebec
 CKAC - Montreal, Quebec
 CHRC - Quebec City, Quebec
 CFOM - Quebec City, Quebec
 CJEC - Quebec City, Quebec — acquired by Leclerc Communication
 CIKI - Rimouski, Quebec — acquired by Bell Media
 CJOI - Rimouski, Quebec — acquired by Bell Media
 CKRS - Saguenay, Quebec — acquired by Attraction Radio
 CIME - Saint-Jérôme, Quebec
 CFZZ - Saint-Jean-sur-Richelieu, Quebec — acquired by Bell Media
 CHLT - Sherbrooke, Quebec
 CKOY - Sherbrooke, Quebec
 CKTS - Sherbrooke, Quebec
 CHLN - Trois Rivières, Quebec

TV 
 Action — replaced by Adult Swim (Canada)
 CH / E!
 CHCH - Hamilton, Ontario — acquired by Channel Zero 
 CJNT - Montreal, Quebec — acquired by Channel Zero - now owned by Rogers Media as City O&O
 CHEK - Victoria, British Columbia — acquired by CHEK Media Group
 CHCA - Red Deer, Alberta — ceased as of August 31, 2009 following shutdown of CH / E!
 BBC Canada (80%) — shut down
 BBC Kids (80%) — acquired by BC's Knowledge Network and shut down
 Discovery Kids — replaced by Nickelodeon (Canada)
 Dusk — replaced by ABC Spark
 Family Channel (50%) — acquired by Astral Media in 2001; now owned by WildBrain
 Score Media (25.93%) — shares sold in 1999
 The Score Television Network — renamed to Sportsnet 360, currently owned by Rogers Media
 Fine Living — replaced by DIY Network (Canada)
 Movie Central — replaced by west feed of Bell Media's The Movie Network 
 Encore Avenue — replaced by west feed of Bell Media's The Movie Network Encore
 HBO Canada (west feed) — acquired by Bell Media
 IFC (Canada) — shut down
 CoolTV — shut down
 Edge TV — shut down
 Fox Sports World Canada — shut down
 X-Treme Sports — shut down
 Country Canada — acquired by CBC in 2002; now owned by Blue Ant Media as Cottage Life
 Documentary Channel — acquired by CBC
 KidsCo (43.8%)
 Leonardo World — shut down
 Video Italia — shut down
 Qubo — acquired by Ion Media Networks
 Locomotion — acquired by Sony Pictures Entertainment and replaced by Animax.
 Max Trax — now Stingray Music
 Sundance Channel (Canada) — shut down
 Teletoon Retro — replaced by Disney Channel (Canada) and Cartoon Network (Canada)
 Télétoon Rétro — replaced by La Chaîne Disney
 Cosmopolitan TV (Canada) — shut down
 FYI (Canada) — shut down
 TLN Media Group — acquired by TLN Media Group
 EuroWorld Sport (50.5%)
 Mediaset Italia (50.5%)
 Mediaset TG24 (50.5%)
 Telebimbi (50.5%)
 Telelatino (50.5%)
 TeleNiños (50.5%)
 Univision Canada (50.5%)

Publishing 
 Klutz — now owned by Scholastic

See also 
 List of assets owned by Shaw Communications

References 

Corus Entertainment
Corus Entertainment
Corus Entertainment